Travis Ehrhardt (born April 12, 1989) is a Canadian professional ice hockey defenceman who last played for Glasgow Clan in the Elite Ice Hockey League (EIHL).

Playing career
Ehrhardt spent his Junior Ice Hockey career with the Moose Jaw Warriors and Portland Winter Hawks, both of the Western Hockey League.

At the end of the 2008-09 Western Hockey League season, Ehrhardt signed an Amateur Try-Out with the Manitoba Moose of the American Hockey League, for which he played 3 games during the 2008–09 season.

On July 6, 2009, Ehrhardt was signed as a free agent by the Detroit Red Wings to a three-year entry level contract. During the duration of his contract with the Red Wings, Ehrnardt played for two of the team's minor league affiliates, the Grand Rapids Griffins of the American Hockey League and the Toledo Walleye of the ECHL.

Ehrhardt subsequently signed with TPS of the Finnish SM-liiga for the 2012-13 season.

During the 2013-14 season, Ehrhardt played for both the St. John's IceCaps of the American Hockey League and the Stavanger Oilers of the Norwegian GET-ligaen.

For the 2014–05 season, Ehrhardt joined the Utica Comets of the American Hockey League on a Professional Try-Out contract and was signed by the Comets to a Standard Player Contract on November 18, 2014.

On September 8, 2016, Ehrhardt was offered a PTO by Genève-Servette HC of the National League A. After a successful tryout, he was signed to a one-year contract by Geneve-Servette on September 11, 2016.

Personal information
Travis' younger brother Dallas (born July 31, 1992) currently plays Hockey with the Manchester Storm of the Elite Ice Hockey League. He is a member of Great Britain men's national ice hockey team.

Career statistics

Regular season and playoffs

International

References

External links 

1989 births
Canadian ice hockey defencemen
Canadian expatriate ice hockey players in China
Canadian expatriate ice hockey players in Finland
Canadian expatriate ice hockey players in Norway
Canadian expatriate ice hockey players in Scotland
Genève-Servette HC players
Glasgow Clan players
Grand Rapids Griffins players
HC TPS players
KRS Heilongjiang players
Living people
Manitoba Moose players
Moose Jaw Warriors players
Portland Winterhawks players
Ice hockey people from Calgary
St. John's IceCaps players
Stavanger Oilers players
Toledo Walleye players
Utica Comets players
Canadian expatriate ice hockey players in the United States
Canadian expatriate ice hockey players in Switzerland
Citizens of the United Kingdom through descent
Canadian people of English descent
British ice hockey defencemen